Geoffrey Lloyd may refer to:
Geoffrey Lloyd, Baron Geoffrey-Lloyd (1902–1984), British Conservative politician and life peer
Geoffrey D. Lloyd (died 1986), Welsh journalist
G. E. R. Lloyd (born 1933), historian of science at the University of Cambridge
Geoff Lloyd (born 1973), British radio presenter
 Geoff Lloyd (footballer) (born 1942), Welsh footballer
Geoff Lloyd, former bassist of the now defunct Canadian rock group Matthew Good Band
Sammy Lloyd (Geoffrey Lloyd), rugby league footballer of the 1960s and 1970s

See also
Jeff Lloyd (1914–1997), speedway rider